Jan Matoušek (born 9 May 1998) is a Czech professional football midfielder or forward currently playing for Bohemians  1905 on loan from Slavia Prague in the Czech First League.

Club career

Příbram
He made his league debut in Příbram's Czech National Football League 2–3 home loss against Vlašim on 12 August 2017. He scored his first league goals eleven days later in their 3–1 home win against Varnsdorf. He was the club's top goalscorer, achieved promotion to the Czech First League with them and won the National League Best Player Award in his debut season. In his second match in the top flight, he scored two goals in Příbram's 4–2 home win against Bohemians Prague. Following this, he was signed by SK Slavia Prague for a transfer fee speculated to be around 40 million CZK (€1.6 million), the highest fee paid in a transfer between two Czech clubs. He stayed at Příbram on loan that was supposed to last until January 2019, but was recalled by Slavia due to an injury crisis. As a replacement for Matoušek, Slavia sent Ruslan Mingazow on loan to Příbram.

Slavia Prague
Matoušek made his debut for Slavia in a 3–1 Czech First League win at Slovácko. He scored his first goal for the club on 25 October 2018 in their 1–0 UEFA Europa League group stage win at Copenhagen.

In February 2019, he returned to Příbram on loan until the end of the season.

Career statistics

Club

References

External links
 
 
 Jan Matoušek official international statistics
 
 Jan Matoušek profile on the SK Slavia Prague official website

Czech footballers
Czech Republic youth international footballers
1998 births
Living people
Czech National Football League players
Czech First League players
1. FK Příbram players
SK Slavia Prague players
Association football midfielders
Association football forwards
FK Jablonec players
FC Slovan Liberec players
Sportspeople from Příbram
Czech Republic under-21 international footballers
Bohemians 1905 players